Zvonimir Kvaternik (October 18, 1918 – October 19, 1994) was an American football guard who played one season for the Pittsburgh Steelers of the National Football League in 1934. He played college football at the University of Kansas.

Kavernik later operated a remodeling company called Creative Kitchens.

References

External links 

 Zvonimir Kvaternik at Find a Grave

1918 births
1994 deaths
American football guards
Kansas Jayhawks football players
Pittsburgh Steelers players
Players of American football from Kansas
Sportspeople from Kansas City, Kansas